Proprioseiopsis lenis is a species of mite in the family Phytoseiidae.

References

lenis
Articles created by Qbugbot
Animals described in 1966